Ba'quba Stadium, also known as Diyala Stadium, is a multi-use stadium in Baqubah, Diyala Governorate, Iraq.  It is used for football matches and serves as the home stadium of Diyala football club. The stadium holds about 10,000 people.

See also 
List of football stadiums in Iraq

References

External links
 Goalzz.com
 Soccerway.com

Football venues in Iraq
Buildings and structures in Diyala Province